Prague 9 is both a municipal and an administrative district in Prague, Czech Republic. Prague 9 administrative districts takes care mainly of districts of Vysočany, Prosek, Hrdlořezy, and partly of Hloubětín, Libeň, Střížkov a Malešice.

O2_Arena_(Prague) is located in Prague 9 on the edge of Libeň and Vysočany districts.

See also

Districts of Prague#Symbols

References

External links 
 Prague 9 - Official homepage 

Districts of Prague